Mr. Peek-a-Boo or Garou-Garou, le Passe-muraille (often shortened to just Le Passe-muraille) is a 1951 French comedy film,  directed by Jean Boyer. The film is based on the short story by Marcel Aymé about a "man who could walk through walls". The film premiered on 6 April 1951.

Plot
Léon, a simple civil servant, who has the unusual ability to walk through walls, falls madly in love with a hotel thief by the name of Susan. He poses as the notorious gangster Garou-Garou to attempt to woo her affections, but is arrested and sent to prison. As a prisoner he annoys the guards by walking in and out of his cell, and keeps asking Susan to cease her criminal way of life. As fundamentally being an honest and law-abiding citizen, he eventually handles back everything he has stolen, is acquitted by the court, and becomes famous and respected. When he learns that Susan is planning to return to England and start a new life, he decides to confess his emotions to her.  However, the couple is interrupted by a sudden rush of journalists. Trying to escape in a building, they get cornered on a corridor, and Léon pushes Susan through a nearby wall. But by doing this, he loses his own wall-walking ability, and the film concludes.

Cast
Bourvil	 ... 	Léon Dutilleul
Joan Greenwood	... 	Susan
Gérard Oury... 	Maurice
Roger Tréville	... 	Félix Burdin
Jacques Erwin	... 	Gaston
Frédéric O'Brady	... 	the medical specialist (as O'Brady)
René Worms	... 	an employee at the ministry
Nina Myral	... 	Mrs. Eloise
André Dalibert		
Nicole Riche	... 	the lady on the second floor
Germaine Reuver	... 	Mrs. Ménard, the concierge
Jeanne Véniat	... 	the South-American lady
Georges Flateau	... 	Mr Robert
Edmond Beauchamp	... 	Arturo (as Beauchamp)
Henri Crémieux	... 	Gustave Lécuyer

Overview
Le Passe-muraille launched the film career of its star, Bourvil, who at the time was only known as a stage comic and singer. Bourvil plays the character of Léon, an ordinary man of the street with particular affection for women, especially Joan Greenwood's character, Susan.

The film is noted for its surprising quality of the special effects which were in their infancy at the time this film was made. The film was released in black and white although a colour version of the film also exists.

See also
The Man Who Walked Through the Wall (1959)

References

External links 
 

1951 films
1950s fantasy comedy films
French fantasy comedy films
Italian fantasy comedy films
1950s French-language films
Films with screenplays by Michel Audiard
Films based on works by Marcel Aymé
Films based on short fiction
French superhero films
1950s superhero films
Italian superhero films
Superhero comedy films
Supernatural comedy films
1951 comedy films
French black-and-white films
Italian black-and-white films
Films directed by Jean Boyer
1950s Italian films
1950s French films